Lindsaea trichomanoides is a small, tufted fern from Australia and New Zealand. It is typically found on dry sites in lowland to montane forest and shrubland.

The fronds of L. trichomanoides are between 5 cm and 25 cm long.

References

Lindsaeaceae
Ferns of New Zealand
Plants described in 1797